

Canadian Football News in 1933
The Toronto Argonauts lost their first two games of the season, only to storm back and win eight straight, including their first Grey Cup win in 12 years.

The Winnipeg St.John's were a no show at the annual meeting of the Manitoba Rugby Football Union. It was later learned that the St.John's had suspended operations for one season while they got their finances in order.

The MRFU made attempts to get another organization to take over the operations of the St.John's for the 1933 season. Although there was interest in taking over the team on a permanent basis, there was no interest in being custodian of the team for just one season.

In August, the players of the St.John's were dispersed between the Winnipegs and the Garrison. The Garrison was an Army team and only servicemen were eligible to play on the team. The Garrison claimed the only player who qualified (Alf Woods) and the remainder of the players ended up in the camp of the Winnipegs.

With an abundance of players available the Winnipegs operated two teams in 1933. The best players ended up on the Winnipegs who were wearing brand new blue jerseys (they weren't blue & gold until 1934). The remaining players wore the old green jerseys and they played under the name Shamrocks.

The Winnipeg St.John's failed to re-form in 1934.

The British Columbia Rugby Football Union did not have regular season play, but did play 8 games in 3 multi-game series to determine a western semi finalist, and later another final for the league championship.

Regular season

Final regular season standings
Note: GP = Games Played, W = Wins, L = Losses, T = Ties, PF = Points For, PA = Points Against, Pts = Points
*Bold text means that they have clinched the playoffs.

*The Huskies defaulted the final game of the season to the Millers

League Champions

Grey Cup playoffs
Note: All dates in 1933

BCRFU Semifinals series
New Westminster Dodekas win series on points, 14-11, advance to BCRFU finals series
Vancouver Meralomas win series 2 games to 1, advance to BCRFU finals series

BCRFU finals series
Vancouver Meralomas win series on points, 31-10

BCRFU final
Vancouver Meralomas, evidentially playing a second final, win the BCRFU championship

WICRFU final
University of British Columbia Varsity, in front of a sellout crowd of 2500, win the western collegiate championship

CIRFU final

Toronto Varsity Blues quit the Grey Cup championship to focus on studies. 
Sarnia received a bye to the Grey Cup

West semifinals

Winnipeg advances to the Western Final.

Calgary advances to the Western Final.

Finals

Winnipeg will face Toronto in the semifinal.

Toronto won the total-point series by 20–9. Toronto advances to the Grey Cup semifinal.

East semifinal

Toronto Varsity Blues quit the Grey Cup championship to focus on studies. 
Sarnia received a bye to the Grey Cup

Grey Cup semifinal

Toronto advances to the Grey Cup final.

Playoff bracket

Grey Cup Championship

1933 Ontario Rugby Football Union All-Stars
NOTE: During this time most players played both ways, so the All-Star selections do not distinguish between some offensive and defensive positions.
QB – Alex Hayes, Sarnia Imperials
FW – Claude Harris, Sarnia Imperials
FW – Art Synder, Toronto Balmy Beach Beachers
HB – Norm Perry, Sarnia Imperials
HB – Joe Connelly, St. Michael's College
DB – Hugh Sterling, Sarnia Imperials
E  – Syd Reynolds, Toronto Balmy Beach Beachers
E  – Jimmy Burke, St. Michael's College
C  – John Metras, St. Michael's College
G – Norman Mountain, Hamilton Tiger Cubs
G – Johnny Baker, Sarnia Imperials
T – Gil Putnam, Sarnia Imperials
T – Clarence Burt, St. Michael's College

1933 Canadian Football Awards
 Jeff Russel Memorial Trophy (IRFU MVP) – Huck Welch (RB), Montreal AAA Winged Wheelers

References

 
Canadian Football League seasons